Lal Suhanra railway station is located in  Pakistan.

See also
 Lal Suhanra National Park
 List of railway stations in Pakistan
 Pakistan Railways

References

External links

Railway stations in Bahawalpur District
Railway stations on Samasata–Amruka Branch Line